The Immanuel Church is a church building at Oxtorgsgatan in Jönköping, Sweden. Belonging to the Uniting Church in Sweden, it was built in 1975 and opened in 1976.

References

External links
official website 

Churches in Jönköping
Churches completed in 1976
Uniting Church in Sweden churches